Clanwilliam, Manitoba is a community in the Rural Municipality of Minto-Odanah in Manitoba, Canada. The Municipality of Clanwilliam – Erickson immediately north takes its name from the community.

A post office was opened there in 1882 and was originally identified as Clan William (30-16-17W). In 1902 the post office was moved to coordinate with the Canadian National railway on 13-16-18W. The original name requested for the community by the residents was Lamontagne but Ottawa assigned the present name to honour Richard Meade, 4th Earl of Clanwilliam. Clanwilliam is home of the Fastball team the Clanwilliam Greys. A team which was inducted into the Manitoba Softball Hall of Fame in 2013. A team in their early 20s, they dominated fastball in southern Manitoba. They were undefeated during the first two seasons in the Minnedosa and District Fastball League; and, combined with tournament games, played 90 games in 1972 and 92 games in 1973. The latter brought them $1,100.00 in tournament prize money. With several additions, they joined the Brandon Centennial Fastball League in 1973, and by 1976, they won the league title and played in the Senior 'A' provincials for the 4th consecutive year. A dominating presence in league and provincial play. The name "Greys" comes from the school in Clanwilliam that was called "Grey School"

References 
  Manitoba Historical Society - Oral History: Clanwilliam, 1918
 Geographical Names of Manitoba - the Millennium Bureau of Canada
 
 

Unincorporated communities in Westman Region